Rhynchodes ursus, or elephant weevil, is a wood-boring weevil found all over New Zealand. Adult weevils are found on trees, where they gather to feed on sap. Larvae tunnel into dead trunks and branches of southern beeches, rimu and Dracophyllum traversii.
This large weevil has a deep brown colour with two lighter bands near the side of its thorax. It has black legs with a spot of yellowish-brown hairs on each femur. It has dense scales on its body, which can be hair-like. In female specimens the antennae are inserted halfway along the rostrum and nearer the front in males. The larvae of Rhynchodes ursus are the host of New Zealand's largest parasitic wasp, Certonotus fractinervis. Female wasps use a long ovipositor to lay eggs inside the larvae whilst they develop inside trees.

References

Cryptorhynchinae
Beetles of New Zealand
Endemic fauna of New Zealand
Beetles described in 1846
Taxa named by Adam White (zoologist)
Endemic insects of New Zealand